Tullakool is a village community in the south west part of the Riverina. The place by road, is situated about 23 kilometres east from Burraboi and 27 km (17 mi) west from Wakool. It was the location of the first commercial rice crop in the Murray valley.

In 1948 the area was divided into Soldier settlement allotments.

Notes and references

Towns in the Riverina
Towns in New South Wales
Australian soldier settlements
1948 establishments in Australia